Professor Timothy Taylor is a British television producer best known for his work as the originator and producer of Channel 4's popular archaeology series Time Team. He is an Executive Producer for Time Team America.

Taylor spent five years teaching, including two years VSO in Thailand, after completing a degree at the University of Birmingham and a PGCE at the University of Exeter. On leaving teaching he set up a company which specialised in producing educational programmes for schools. Today, Taylor is an independent writer and producer of archaeology programmes. He devised the format for Channel 4's Time Team, which was developed from an earlier Channel 4 series Time Signs, first broadcast in 1991. Produced by Taylor, it featured Mick Aston and Phil Harding, who both went on to appear on Time Team. He also produced the spin-off series History Hunters, Time Team Digs and Time Team Live.

Taylor is a Visiting Industrial Professor for the Public Understanding of Archaeology at the University of Bristol, and has written a series of best selling books including The World Atlas of Archaeology in collaboration with Professor Mick Aston, The Ultimate Time Team Companion: An Alternative History of Britain, Behind the Scenes at Time Team, Digging the Dirt and Time Team: A Guide to the Archaeological Sites of Britain and Ireland.

Taylor recently received a Visiting Professorship in 'Archaeology in the Media' from the University of Exeter.

References

External links
2003 interview with Taylor - Dirt Brothers Road Trip

Living people
English television producers
Alumni of the University of Bristol
Alumni of the University of Exeter
Time Team
Alumni of the University of Birmingham
Year of birth missing (living people)